The Bréguet 410 was a French bomber of the early 1930s. Not many of these twin-engined sesquiwing biplanes were built. At least one Breguet 413, one of its variants, was sold to the Spanish Republican Air Force during the Spanish Civil War.

Design and development
The Bréguet 410 was a sesquiplane prototype designed by Breguet Aviation in order to meet the requirements of the Technical Aeronautic Service ( Service Technique de L'Aéronautique ) of the French government towards the end of the 1920s, for a bomber and reconnaissance plane type designated as Multiplace de Combat. It had a steel frame covered with duralumin; its armament was two front and two rear 7.7 mm Lewis machine guns and it could carry a bombload up to 1300 kg.

Only one unit of the first variant, the Bréguet 410, was built, which was passed in favour of the competing Amiot 143 despite its combat qualities. Other prototypes, such as the Blériot 137 and the SPCA 30, underwent a similar fate as the Bréguet 410. Most of its later developments or variants never went past the prototype stage.

Operational history
The sole Bréguet 410 flew in 1931 powered by two Hispano-Suiza 12Nb engines. Developments followed though, with an upgraded and slightly modified version, the Bréguet 411, which flew in 1932. Like its predecessor this Bréguet aircraft was again rejected by the French government.

The Bréguet 413 was an improved version, fitted with more powerful Hispano-Suiza 12Ybrs engines. Four units were constructed for the Armée de l'Air, the first one of which flew in February 1933. At least one of these became part of the Escadrille Internationale and was sent to the Spanish Republican Air Force at the beginning of the Civil War in that country, but its fate is unknown.

A further development followed, the Bréguet 414, fitted with Gnome-Rhône 14Kdrs engines and first flew in November 1933. The sole 414 crashed in 1940.

The improved Bre 420 first flew on 13 August 1936, but failed to improve performance and handling enough to warrant production.

Variants
Bre 410 M4  
Light bomber with two HS12Nb engines (1931)
Bre 411 M5  
Light bomber with two HS12Nb engines, (1932 - one built).
Bre 413  
Light bomber with two HS12Ybrs engines (1933)
Bre 413 M4 
Light bomber with two HS12Ybrs engines
Bre 414  
Light bomber with two GR14Kirs radial engines (1933).
Bre 420
An improved 414 with modified rear fuselage and tail section.

Operators

 Armée de l'Air

 Spanish Republican Air Force

Specifications

See also

References

Bibliography

External links

 Breguet
 Airwar - Breguet 413
 Postcard - Breguet 413
 Flying fortresses

1930s French bomber aircraft
 0410
Sesquiplanes
Aircraft first flown in 1931
Twin piston-engined tractor aircraft